Ariane Fortin (born November 20, 1984) is a Canadian southpaw amateur boxer. She is a two-time World Boxing Champion. She also won a silver medal in the middleweight category at the 2014 Commonwealth Games and a bronze medal at the 2015 Pan American Games in Toronto, Canada.

In order to compete at the 2014 Commonwealth Games, as well as the World Championship in 2014, Ariane ran a successful crowdfunding campaign on MAKEACHAMP.

Fortin took up boxing in 2004. In 2005, at 21 years old, she took part of the 2005 World Championships and won the silver medal. A year later, she won the gold medal at the 2006 World Championships in New Delhi, and repeated the same performance at the 2008 World Championships in Ningbo, China.

After failing to qualify to the 2012 Summer Olympics decided to move to another country with less rivalry in boxing. She chose Lebanon and started learning Arabic, but reconsidered after intervention from the International Amateur Boxing Association. Her attempts to qualify for the 2012 Olympics were presented in the 2013 Canadian documentary Last Women Standing.

In 2014, she competed in the World Championships in South Korea and took the bronze medal, suffering her only loss in the semifinal against American and already Olympic champion Claressa Shields.

In July 2016, she was officially named to Canada's Olympic team. At the Olympics she was eliminated in the first bout in a controversial split decision.

References

External links

 
 
 
 

1984 births
Living people
Canadian women boxers
Middleweight boxers
Olympic boxers of Canada
Boxers at the 2016 Summer Olympics
Pan American Games bronze medalists for Canada
Pan American Games medalists in boxing
Boxers at the 2015 Pan American Games
Commonwealth Games silver medallists for Canada
Commonwealth Games medallists in boxing
Boxers at the 2014 Commonwealth Games
Sportspeople from Quebec
AIBA Women's World Boxing Championships medalists
Medalists at the 2015 Pan American Games
20th-century Canadian women
21st-century Canadian women
Medallists at the 2014 Commonwealth Games